Wedbush Securities Inc. is a privately held investment firm based in Los Angeles.  As of February 2022, the firm had $4.1 billion under management with 7,460 clients.

History
The firm was founded in 1955 by two high school friends, Edward W. Wedbush and Robert Werner, in Los Angeles, California. They each contributed $5,000 to capitalize their new company, Wedbush & Company. The company was named after Wedbush because neither partner wanted a possible business failure named after them and Wedbush lost a coin toss.

Wedbush opened its first office in 1957 located in the Crenshaw district of Los Angeles.  Three years later, Robert Werner decided to sell his interest in the firm to Ed Wedbush. In 1972, the firm began offering correspondent clearing services, providing trade execution for other brokerage firms.

References

External links

Investment banks in the United States
Financial services companies established in 1955
Brokerage firms
Companies based in Los Angeles
1955 establishments in California